Where Do They Go? is the fourth studio album by New Zealand new wave band Mi-Sex, released in November 1983. The album peaked at number 80 on the Australian Kent Music Report. It would be the band's last studio album until Not from Here in 2016.

Track listing

Charts

References

Mi-Sex albums
CBS Records albums
1983 albums